The Rote myzomela (Myzomela irianawidodoae) is a species of Indonesian honeyeater endemic to the island of Rote. It is considered distinct from the Sumba myzomela based on voice. It was named after Iriana Joko Widodo, the first lady of Indonesia at the time of description. It has a scarlet head and nape, as well as lower back and tail, and a dark grey upper back and light grey stomach. It is threatened by habitat loss.

References

Myzomela
Endemic fauna of Indonesia
Birds of the Lesser Sunda Islands
Birds described in 2017